Khalifeh Davud (also Romanized as Khalīfeh Dāvūd) is a village in Arshaq-e Shomali Rural District, Arshaq District, Meshgin Shahr County, Ardabil Province, Iran. At the 2006 census, its population was 278, in 67 families.

References 

Towns and villages in Meshgin Shahr County